Bloomfield Lodge, formerly known as Peppers Bloomfield Lodge, is a boutique rainforest lodge set between the Great Barrier Reef and Daintree Rainforest in Far North Queensland, Australia.  It is one of Australia’s most exclusive retreats and a member of Small Luxury Hotels of the World and Drake & Cavendish. The Lodge's location allows for stargazing and claims the ability to see more than 3,000 stars with the naked eye.

In 2005 the Lodge was awarded the best non-beach resort hotel worldwide in a survey of more than 15,000 British travellers. Bloomfield Lodge is owned by Mike Gooley who also owns Trailfinders, the UK's largest independent travel company with 29 travel centres in the United Kingdom, Ireland and Australia and Hinterland Aviation, an airline based in Cairns that is used to ferry hotel guests to the nearby grass strip airfield.

References

External links
Bloomfield Lodge

Hotels in Queensland
Buildings and structures in Far North Queensland